Konturen ( Contours) is the sixth studio album by German singer-songwriter Johannes Oerding. It was released through Columbia Records on 8 November 2019. It debuted atop the German Albums Chart, becoming Oerding's first number-one album in Germany. It was supported by the single "An guten Tagen".

Background
Oerding named the album Konturen (Contours) after a line in the song "Alles okay": "Und dieser Dreck auf meiner Haut ist mir endlich so vertraut. Denn diese Spuren und Konturen machen mich aus" ("And this dirt on my skin is finally so familiar to me, because these traces and contours make me"). Oerding said that with his sixth album, he wanted to find his own "profile more and more".

Oerding recorded "Ich hab dich nicht mehr zu verlieren" with singer Ina Müller, his girlfriend of 10 years. Oerding remarked that if the topic of the song were not separation, "I would not have done it, everything else I would have found extremely cheesy".

Critical reception

Konturen received generally mixed reviews from music critics. Musicheadquarter'''s Andy called the album the singer's best effort to date, alongside Kreise. The website Mix1 praised the album for documenting a "maturation process" by returning to the singer's roots. In a negative review, Tony Henning of laut.de pointed out that the songs are characterized by a high level of "penetrance and pettiness" and that the record "hits the listener where it hurts the most, namely his ears". Pascal Bremmer of Plattentests'' described the songs as "chumming up" and that the music would fully satisfy mainstream radio listeners in its "naïvety".

Track listing

Charts

Weekly charts

Year-end charts

Certifications

Release history

References

2019 albums
German-language albums
Johannes Oerding albums